Edmund C. Dyas (November 11, 1939 – January 23, 2011) was an American football player, who played college football from 1958 to 1960 for the Auburn Tigers. He finished fourth for the Heisman Trophy his senior season. He was an integral member on the 1958 team that finished 9-0-1. Dyas was elected to the College Football Hall of Fame in 2009. 

After his college football career, Dyas became an orthopedic surgeon in Mobile, Alabama. He died on January 23, 2011, aged 71, from stomach cancer.

References

External links
 NFF profile
 Dr. Ed Dyas Elected To College Football Hall of Fame
 Notice of Dyas' death

1939 births
2011 deaths
Sportspeople from Mobile, Alabama
Players of American football from Alabama
American football running backs
Auburn Tigers football players
College Football Hall of Fame inductees
American surgeons
Burials in Alabama
Deaths from cancer in Alabama
Deaths from stomach cancer